Horst Krüger (September 17, 1919 Magdeburg – October 21, 1999 Frankfurt am Main) was a German novelist. His autobiographical debut novel, A Crack in the Wall: Growing Up Under Hitler (original title Das Zerbrochene Haus. Eine Jugend in Deutschland or The Broken House: A Youth in Germany) is regarded as an exemplary portrait of youth in Germany in the time of the Third Reich, and received international acclaim. His travel literature on various parts of the world has found a wide audience.

Biography
Horst Krüger grew up in Berlin. He studied philosophy and literature at the Humboldt University of Berlin and the University of Freiburg. From 1952 to 1967 he ran a literature program on a Baden-Baden radio-station. After 1967 he lived in Frankfurt am Main working as a freelance writer. He wrote travel stories, which often took an ethnographic-perspective and dispensed with the style current in feuilletons. Running themes in Krüger's work were Germany's Nazi past and its aftermath, the partition of Germany and his own youth in Berlin-Eichkamp.

Krüger was a member of the German Academy for Language and Poetry and PEN.

1919 births
1999 deaths
Recipients of the Cross of the Order of Merit of the Federal Republic of Germany
20th-century German novelists
German male novelists
20th-century German male writers